Cleo Walker (born 1948) is a former linebacker and center in the National Football League.

Biography
Walker was born Cleo Franklin Walker on February 7, 1948, in Columbus, Georgia. He attended the William H. Spencer high school. Cleo Walker wrote of himself. [" In the last pre season game of the 1970 season Green Bay Vs Oakland @ Oakland. Then rookie Cleo Walker  intercepted Kenny [ The Snake ] Stabler three times in the 4th Qtr. These steals not only sealed  the game for Green Bay , but also assured Walker a place on the Green Bay Packers roster."

Career
Walker was drafted by the Green Bay Packers in the seventh round of the 1970 NFL Draft and played that season with the team. The following season, he played with the Atlanta Falcons.

He played at the collegiate level at the University of Louisville. He played for the Cardinals from 1967 to 1970. After retiring from football, he worked as a comptroller for Ryder Trucks and then for the FBI.

In 2001 he was inducted to the Cardinals Athletics Hall of Fame.

See also
List of Green Bay Packers players

References

1948 births
Living people
Players of American football from Columbus, Georgia
Green Bay Packers players
Atlanta Falcons players
American football linebackers
American football centers
Louisville Cardinals football players